Events in the year 1156 in Norway.

Incumbents
 Monarchs – Eystein II Haraldsson and Inge I Haraldsson

Events

Births
Magnus V Erlingsson – King of Norway from 1161 to 1184 (died 1184).

Deaths

References

Norway